Nebria bissenica is a species of ground beetle in the Nebriinae subfamily that is endemic to Romania.

References

bissenica
Beetles described in 1887
Beetles of Europe
Endemic fauna of Romania